The Mondovì Funicular is a funicular railway in the town of Mondovì, Piedmont, Italy. It links Breo, the old quarter,
with Piazza, the upper part of the town.

The line first opened in 1886 and was initially operated using the water counterbalance system. The line was converted to electrical operation in 1926 and was closed to traffic on December 24, 1975. After over thirty years closure, followed by a major rebuild, the line was reopened on December 16, 2006. The reconstruction was done by the consortium Doppelmayr Italia-Impresa Generale Costruzioni Garboli SpA-Mondovì. The rebuild involved the reconstruction of the two terminal stations, construction of a new passing loop, and the provision of two new panoramic cars.

The funicular operates every 10 minutes. On most days service is between 07.30 and 19.50, with  service until midnight on Fridays and Saturdays, and no service until 10.20 on Sundays and public holidays. On the first Monday of each month, there is no service after 13.40.

The funicular has the following technical parameters:

In 2018, the line carried 386,847 passengers.

See also 
 List of funicular railways

References

External links
 
 Video of the line from YouTube

Funicular railways in Piedmont
Former water-powered funicular railways converted to electricity
Standard gauge railways in Italy
Railway lines opened in 1886
Mondovì